The 1884 Wabash College football team represented Wabash College during the 1884 college football season. The team would not garner the nickname "Little Giants" until late in its 1904 football season.

Schedule

References

Wabash
Wabash Little Giants football seasons
College football undefeated seasons
Wabash football